Clarksburg is an unincorporated community and census-designated place in Fugit Township, Decatur County, Indiana, United States. As of the 2010 census, the population of Clarksburg was 149.

History
Clarksburg was laid out in 1832. It was named for its founder, Woodson Clark.

The Clarksburg post office was established in 1835, but the name of the post office was officially spelled Clarksburgh until 1893.

John Miller, Justice of the Indiana Supreme Court, was born in Clarksburg in 1840.

Geography

Demographics

References

Census-designated places in Decatur County, Indiana
Census-designated places in Indiana